The moustached woodcreeper (Xiphocolaptes falcirostris) is a species of bird in the Dendrocolaptinae subfamily. It is endemic to Brazil.

Its natural habitat is subtropical or tropical dry forests. It is threatened by habitat loss.

References

External links

BirdLife Species Factsheet.

Xiphocolaptes
Birds of Brazil
Birds of the Caatinga
Endemic birds of Brazil
Birds described in 1824
Taxonomy articles created by Polbot